Herbert Clifton "Cliff" Blue (August 28, 1910 – March 10, 1990) was an American newspaper editor, publisher, owner and politician.

Life and career
Blue was born to John Patrick Blue and Christian Stewart Blue in Moore County, North Carolina, on August 28, 1910. He served nine terms in the North Carolina General Assembly after first being elected in 1947, and as Speaker of the House during the 1963 session. He died on March 10, 1990, in Pinehurst, North Carolina. A portion of U.S. Route 1 in Aberdeen, North Carolina, close to his former home has been dedicated as H. Clifton Blue Memorial Highway in honor of his contributions to the region.

References 

Members of the North Carolina House of Representatives
American editors
1910 births
People from Moore County, North Carolina
1990 deaths